Ear-Resistible is the 57th studio album by American vocal group the Temptations. It was released by Motown on	May 16, 2000. Featuring the Top 20 Urban Adult Contemporary singles "I'm Here", which peaked at #3, and "Selfish Reasons", which peaked at #18, the album won the 2001 Grammy Award for Best Traditional R&B Performance.

Critical reception

AllMusic editor Jason Elias found that with the album "the group turns in its strongest set since 1984's Truly for You [...] Co-executive produced by Kedar Massenburg and Otis Williams, Ear-Resistible proves that you don't need rap cameos or expletives to make a great R&B album."

Track listing

Personnel
Terry Weeks – tenor vocals
Barrington "Bo" Henderson – tenor vocals 
Otis Williams – baritone vocals
Ron Tyson – tenor/falsetto vocals
Harry McGilberry – bass vocals

Charts

References 

2000 albums
The Temptations albums
Albums produced by Narada Michael Walden
Motown albums
Grammy Award for Best Traditional R&B Vocal Performance